Grimoires are fundamentally books that will supposedly grant their users magical powers, which date back to ancient times. In several of these books, rituals designed to help summon spirits are found. Below you will find a list of the spirits whose titles show up in these grimoires for evocation ritual purposes. Note the list does not include all Enochian angels.

See also
List of angels in theology

References

Citations

Literature sources

Grimoires
Literature lists
Occult books
Religion-related lists